Picotee describes flowers whose edge is a different colour than the flower's base colour. The word originates from the French picoté, meaning 'marked with points'.

Examples

References 

Flowers
Plant morphology